Carlos Alberto Puente Salas (born 16 December 1971) is a Mexican politician affiliated with the PVEM. He currently serves as senator of the LXIII Legislature of the Mexican Congress representing Zacatecas. He also served as deputy in the LX Legislature.

Puente Salas replaced Pablo Escudero Morales as the Green Party's designee to the Constituent Assembly of Mexico City after Escudero became the president of the board of directors of the Senate.

References

1971 births
Living people
Politicians from Zacatecas City
Members of the Senate of the Republic (Mexico)
Members of the Chamber of Deputies (Mexico)
Ecologist Green Party of Mexico politicians
21st-century Mexican politicians
Members of the Constituent Assembly of Mexico City
Presidents of the Green Ecologist Party of Mexico
Senators of the LXII and LXIII Legislatures of Mexico